The Cachil DeHe Band of Wintun Native Americans of the Colusa Native Americans Community of the Colusa Rancheria is a federally recognized tribe of Wintun Native Americans from central California.

Reservation

The tribe's reservation is the Colusa Rancheria, also known as the Cachildehe Rancheria. The ranchería is located in Colusa County, California and was founded in 1907. Population is approximately 77.

Government
The Colusa Indian Colony is governed by a democratically elected tribal council. They are headquartered in Colusa, California, and their current tribal chairperson is Wayne Mitchum.

Language
Traditionally, the tribe spoke the Wintun/Patwin language, a Wintuan language of the Penutian language family. The Colusa Indian Community Council published a language book and are working on language CDs and DVDs to help foster language preservation.

The traditional language spoken by Wintun (Patwin) people was not Wintu, but Patwin or Wintun. Wintu was a Penutian language spoken by the Wintu people of lands north of Cottonwood Creek in the area of Redding, California.

Economic development
The tribe owns and operates the Colusa Casino Resort, Table 45 (casual dining), 37 Seventy (fine dining), and Jack's Place (bar), all located inside Colusa Casino Resort.

History
The Cachil Dehe Band of Wintun Indians, with 45 original members, ratified their constitution and by-laws on November 23, 1941. In 1969 the tribe started to build a traditional roundhouse and refurbished it in 1993.

Education
The ranchería is served by the Colusa Unified School District.

Notes

References
 Hinton, Leanne. Flutes of Fire: Essays on California Indian Languages. Berkeley: Heyday Books, 1994. .
 Pritzker, Barry M. A Native American Encyclopedia: History, Culture, and Peoples. Oxford: Oxford University Press, 2000. .

External links
Colusa Indian Community, official website
Constitution of the Cachil Dehe Band of Wintun Indians of the Colusa Indian Community

Wintun
Geography of Colusa County, California
Native American tribes in California
American Indian reservations in California
Federally recognized tribes in the United States
1941 establishments in California